Abstract strategy games in contrast to strategy games in general usually have no or minimal narrative theme, outcomes determined only by player choice (with no randomness), and each players have perfect information about the game. For example, Go is a pure abstract strategy game since it fulfills all three criteria; chess and related games are nearly so but feature a recognizable theme of ancient warfare; and Stratego is borderline since it is deterministic, loosely based on 19th-century Napoleonic warfare, and features concealed information.

Definition

Combinatorial games have no randomizers such as dice, no simultaneous movement, nor hidden information.  Some games that do have these elements are sometimes classified as abstract strategy games.  (Games such as Continuo, Octiles, Can't Stop, and Sequence, could be considered abstract strategy games, despite having a luck or bluffing element.) A smaller category of abstract strategy games manages to incorporate hidden information without using any random elements; the best known example is Stratego.

Traditional abstract strategy games are often treated as a separate game category, hence the term 'abstract games' is often used for competitions that exclude them and can be thought of as referring to modern abstract strategy games. Two examples are the IAGO World Tour (2007–2010) and the Abstract Games World Championship held annually since 2008 as part of the Mind Sports Olympiad. 

Some abstract strategy games have multiple starting positions of which it is required that one be randomly determined.  For a game to be one of skill, a starting position needs to be chosen by impartial means.  Some games, such as Arimaa and DVONN, have the players build the starting position in a separate initial phase which itself conforms strictly to combinatorial game principles.  Most players, however, would consider that although one is then starting each game from a different position, the game itself contains no luck element. Indeed, Bobby Fischer promoted randomization of the starting position in chess in order to increase player dependence on thinking at the board.
          
As J. Mark Thompson wrote in his article "Defining the Abstract", play is sometimes said to resemble a series of puzzles the players pose to each other: There is an intimate relationship between such games and puzzles: every board position presents the player with the puzzle, What is the best move?, which in theory could be solved by logic alone. A good abstract game can therefore be thought of as a "family" of potentially interesting logic puzzles, and the play consists of each player posing such a puzzle to the other. Good players are the ones who find the most difficult puzzles to present to their opponents.

Many abstract strategy games also happen to be "combinatorial"; i.e., there is no hidden information, no non-deterministic elements (such as shuffled cards or dice rolls), no simultaneous or hidden movement or setup, and (usually) two players or teams take a finite number of alternating .

Many games which are abstract in nature historically might have developed from thematic games, such as representation of military tactics. In turn, it is common to see thematic version of such games; for example, chess is considered an abstract game, but many thematic versions, such as Star Wars-themed chess, exist.

History 

Mancala is among the oldest known games to still be widely played today. Chess is believed to have originated in northwest India, in the Gupta Empire ( 280–550), where its early form in the 6th century was known as chaturaṅga, literally four divisions [of the military] – infantry, cavalry, elephants, and chariotry, represented by the pieces that would evolve into the modern pawn, knight, bishop, and rook, respectively. Chaturanga was played on an 8×8 uncheckered board, called ashtāpada. Shogi was the earliest chess variant to allow captured pieces to be returned to the board by the capturing player. This drop rule is speculated to have been invented in the 15th century and possibly connected to the practice of 15th century mercenaries switching loyalties when captured instead of being killed.

A board resembling a Draughts board was found in Ur dating from 3000 BC. In the British Museum are specimens of ancient Egyptian checkerboards, found with their pieces in burial chambers, and the game was played by Queen Hatasu. Plato mentioned a game, πεττεία or petteia, as being of Egyptian origin, and Homer also mentions it.

Go was considered one of the four essential arts of the cultured aristocratic Chinese scholars in antiquity. The earliest written reference to the game is generally recognized as the historical annal Zuo Zhuan (c. 4th century BC).

Englishmen Lewis Waterman and John W. Mollett both claim to have invented the game of Reversi in 1883, each denouncing the other as a fraud. The game gained considerable popularity in England at the end of the nineteenth century. The game's first reliable mention is in 21 August 1886 edition of The Saturday Review.

Comparison 
Analysis of "pure" abstract strategy games is the subject of combinatorial game theory.  Abstract strategy games with hidden information, bluffing, or simultaneous move elements are better served by Von Neumann–Morgenstern game theory, while those with a component of luck may require probability theory incorporated into either of the above.

As for the qualitative aspects, ranking abstract strategy games according to their interest, complexity, or strategy levels is a daunting task and subject to extreme subjectivity.  In terms of measuring how finite a mathematical field each of the three top contenders represents, it is estimated that checkers has a game-tree complexity of  1040 possible games, whereas chess has approximately 10123. As for Go, the possible legal game positions range in the magnitude of 10170.

Champions
The Mind Sports Olympiad first held the Abstract Games World Championship in 2008 to try to find the best abstract strategy games all-rounder. The MSO event saw a change in format in 2011 restricting the competition to players' five best events, and was renamed to the Modern Abstract Games World Championship.

 2008:  David M. Pearce (England)
 2009:  David M. Pearce (England)
 2010:  David M. Pearce (England)
 2011:  David M. Pearce (England)
 2012:  Andres Kuusk (Estonia)
 2013:  Andres Kuusk (Estonia)

See also 
 Connection games
 Game complexity
 List of abstract strategy games
 List of world championships in mind sports
 Mind Sports Olympiad
 World Mind Sports Games

References

External links 
 The University of Alberta Games Group
 David Eppstein's CGT page

 
Games of mental skill